Ladu Baba Temple is a temple in Bhubaneswar, Odisha, India. It was built in the 13th century AD and was formerly known as Kainchhi Temple.

Location
Ladu Baba temple is located in the Uttara daraja, Badu Sahi, Old Town, Bhubaneswar.
On the right side of Ratha road, leading from Lingaraj Market Complex Chowk to Badheibanka Chowk.
It is 30.00 metres north of Chitrakarini temple and 70.00 metres south of Mohini temple. The temple is
facing towards east. The Sanctum of the temple is empty. However, the sculptural embellishments in 
the outer walls suggest that the temple was originally dedicated to Lord Siva.

Tradition & legends

According to the local tradition, the deity was rescued and shifted from Ravana’s Lanka to Ekamra
Kshetra during the conflagration of Svarna Lanka on the eve of Rama-Ravana war.

Physical description

i) Surrounding: The temple is surrounded by Uttaradaraja, Badu Sahi road in the west and private
residential buildings on all other three sides. The temple is facing towards east.

ii) Architectural features (Plan and Elevation): 
The temple is buried up to half of the jangha except in the western side that is buried up to the 
pabhaga. On plan, the temple is pancharatha, having a square vimana with a frontal porch. The vimana measures 6.00 square metres and the porch is 0.50 metres. On elevation, the temple is in rekha order with usual bada, gandi and mastaka measuring 11.20 metres in height from the present base to kalasa. On elevation,
the bada measuring 2.70 metres in height has five vertical division namely pabhaga (buried) plain,
talajangha (0.76 metres), bandhana three mouldings (0.31 metres), upara jangha (0.73 metres)
and baranda with nine mouldings (0.90 metres). The gandi above the baranda measuring 5.50
metres in height is a curvilinear spire and devoid of any decoration. At the center of the raha
there are Udyota simhas. The mastaka as usual in Orissan temples has components like
beki, amlaka, khapuri and kalasa that measures 3.00 metres in height. The beki recess houses
with beki bhairavas at the top of the raha paga and dopichha simha above the kanika pagas.

iii) Raha niche & parsva devatas:
The raha niches on three sides uniformly measures 1.10 metres in height x 0.51 metres in width x 0.43
metres in depth. All are empty except the western raha niche that enshrines a four armed Ganesa image
standing over a lotus pedestal. His lower left hand is resting over a parasu and lower right hand is
holding an akshya mala while both the upper left and right hands are broken. The image has a jatamukuta.
The trunk of the image is partly broken. There is an ornamented makara torana behind the image in the
background.

Decorative features
Door Jambs: The doorjambs measuring 2.00 metres in height x 1.60 metres
in width are decorated with patra sakha, nara sakha and lata sakha from exterior to interior
on either sides of the entrance portal. At the base of the doorjambs beneath the three sakhas
there are two khakhara mundi dvarapala niches enshrining Saiva dvarapalas who hold trident,
in their left hand. 

Lintel: The architrave above the doorjamb measuring 2.05 metres is carved with navagrahas, 
each within a niche and seated in padmasana.

The temple is partly buried up to the pabhaga and jangha including the doorjambs.
It is in a rapid process of decay because people use the empty sanctum as a garbage stake.
Cracks are seen in the outer walls of the temple due to the growth of vegetations, which
facilitates seepage of rain water into the sanctum. The temple is in a dilapidated condition.
The temple was repaired by Orissa State Archaeology department.

Threats to the property

Water stagnation inside the sanctum, growth of vegetations (pipal trees) in the conjunction of raha 
and anuratha pagas and the conjunction of kanika and anuratha paga and above the doorjambs of the 
eastern wall are cause of concern.

See also
 List of temples in Bhubaneswar

Reference Notes
Lesser Known Monuments of Bhubaneswar by Dr. Sadasiba Pradhan.
https://web.archive.org/web/20121009190909/http://ignca.nic.in/asi_reports/

Shiva temples in Odisha
Hindu temples in Bhubaneswar